is a song recorded by Japanese singer Shizuka Kudo. It was released as a single by Pony Canyon on September 21, 1990. The song made its first album appearance on the compilation album Unlimited, released that same year.

Background
The song is described as a folk ballad driven by acoustic guitar. It was written by Miyuki Nakajima and Tsugutoshi Gotō and arranged by Draw4. It marks the first collaboration between Nakajima and Kudo since "Kōsa ni Fukarete". Lyrically, the song involves Kudo cryptically describing herself to a potential lover, comparing herself to "a rose, a poison, a mystery, or maybe a flame" and asking him whether or not he would ultimately choose to be with her. Nakajima wrote the song from the perspective of Kudo and based herself off of her first impressions of her. In 1992, Nakajima covered the song in concert during the Carnival 1992 tour.

Chart performance
"Watashi ni Tsuite" debuted at number-one on the Oricon Singles Chart, selling 76,000 copies in its first week and becoming the last in a string of eight consecutive number-one singles. The single charted in the top 100 for a total of 13 weeks. The song ranked at number two on the monthly Oricon Singles Chart, bested only by TMN's "Time to Count Down". It ranked at number 46 on the year-end Oricon Singles Chart.

Track listing

Charts

See also
 List of Oricon number-one singles

References

1990 songs
1990 singles
Folk ballads
Oricon Weekly number-one singles
Songs written by Miyuki Nakajima
Shizuka Kudo songs
Pony Canyon singles
Songs written by Tsugutoshi Gotō